Hillsboro R-3 School District is a school district headquartered in Hillsboro, Missouri in Greater St. Louis. Hillsboro and some unincorporated areas are in the district boundaries, and it also serves a small section of DeSoto.

History

In June 2014, the school board hired Leigh Ann Cornman, the wife of superintendent Aaron Cornman, as an instructional coach, on a 5-1 basis. Superintendent Cornman was not a part of the hiring committee. There were accusations that superintendent Cornman had promoted the relaxing of hiring policies so his wife could get a job; the superintendent denied those accusations.

In September 2015, the high school experienced a large number of parents and students protesting against the right of a pre-operation transgender student, Lila Perry, to use the girls' locker room and restrooms.

Schools
The district schools occupy a single area divided into two halves by Business Highway 21. The west campus houses the primary school and high school. The east campus houses the elementary, intermediate south, intermediate north, junior high school, learning center, and data center.
 Hillsboro High School
 Hillsboro Junior High School
 Hillsboro Intermediate School
 Hillsboro Elementary School
 Hillsboro Primary School
 Hillsboro Alternative Program/Hillsboro Learning Center

References

External links
 

Education in Jefferson County, Missouri
School districts in Missouri